The Gulf of Çandarlı, known in antiquity as the Elaitic Gulf, is a gulf on the Aegean Sea, with its inlet between the cities of Çandarlı and Foça. Around it were located the chief cities of the Aeolian confederacy.

See also
Turkey
Aegean Sea

References

Candarli
Candarli
Landforms of İzmir Province